WYGE (92.3 FM) is a radio station licensed to serve London, Kentucky, United States.  The station is owned by Ethel Huff Broadcasting, LLC and airs Christian content.

The station has been assigned these call letters by the Federal Communications Commission since February 22, 1991.

References

External links
 WYGE official website
 
 
 

YGE
Radio stations established in 1991
London, Kentucky